Sebastián de Horozco (1510–1579/80) was a poet and playwright of the Spanish Golden Age. He was born in Toledo.

Selected Dramatic Works
 Representación de la famosa historia de Ruth. 
 Representación de la parábola de San Mateo
 Representación de la historia evangélica del capitulo nono de San Juan
 Coloquio de la muerte con todas las edades y estados
 ''Un Entremés que hizo el author a ruego de una monja parienta suya evangelista”

References

1510 births
1580 deaths
Spanish dramatists and playwrights
Spanish male dramatists and playwrights
Spanish poets
Spanish male poets
University of Salamanca alumni
People of Spanish-Jewish descent